Jackie De Caluwé (6 March 1934 – 20 September 2021) was a footballer who played most of his career for Cercle Brugge.

De Caluwé is the player with the 5th highest all-time appearances for Cercle.

After playing his first ten seasons for Cercle in the Belgian lower leagues, in 1961–62 he made his Belgian Division One debut, and Cercle remained in the top flight for the rest of De Caluwe's career with them.

He ended his career as player-coach with lower division side SV Loppem.

References

1934 births
2021 deaths
Footballers from Bruges
Association football defenders
Association football midfielders
Association football utility players
Belgian footballers
Cercle Brugge K.S.V. players
Belgian Pro League players
Player-coaches
Belgian football managers